Irus is a genus of saltwater clams, marine bivalve molluscs in the family Veneridae, the venus clams.

Species in the genus Irus
Species recognized as of October 2021:
Irus carditoides 
Irus caudex 
Irus crenatus 
Irus cumingii 
Irus elegans 
Irus exoticus 
Irus interstriatus 
Irus irus 
Irus ishibashianus 
Irus macrophylla 
Irus mitis 
Irus reflexus 
Irus vertumnalium

References

 ZipCodeZoo

Veneridae
Bivalve genera